Xerosollya is a genus of flowering plants belonging to the family Pittosporaceae.

Its native range is Western Australia.

Species:
 Xerosollya gilbertii Turcz.

References

Pittosporaceae
Flora of Western Australia
Apiales genera